James Mifflin (1839–?) was a United States Navy sailor and a recipient of America's highest military decoration—the Medal of Honor—for his actions in the American Civil War.

During the Battle of Mobile Bay, Alabama, Mifflin stood fast and performed his ammunition supply duties despite enemy shellfire. For his conduct during this battle, he was awarded the Medal of Honor.

Medal of Honor citation

Rank and Organization:
Engineer's Cook, U.S. Navy. Born: 1839, Richmond, Va. Accredited to: Virginia. G.O. No.: 45, December 31, 1864.

Citation:
<blockquote>On board the U.S.S. Brooklyn during successful attacks against Fort Morgan, rebel gunboats and the ram  in Mobile Bay, 5 August 1864. Stationed in the immediate vicinity of the shell whips which were twice cleared of men by bursting shells, Mifflin remained steadfast at his post and performed his duties in the powder division throughout the furious action which resulted in the surrender of the prize rebel ram Tennessee and in the damaging and destruction of batteries at Fort Morgan.<blockquote>

See also

List of American Civil War Medal of Honor recipients: M–P

Notes

References

1839 births
Year of death missing
United States Navy Medal of Honor recipients
Union Navy sailors
Military personnel from Richmond, Virginia
American Civil War recipients of the Medal of Honor
People of Virginia in the American Civil War